Horaismopterinae is a subfamily of beach flies in the family of Canacidae. There are 5 species in 2 genera, all inhabiting oceanic seashores.

Genera
Horaismoptera Hendel, 1907
Tethinosoma Malloch, 1930

References

Canacidae
Brachycera subfamilies